The Wilge River (iKuthu) is a river in Mpumalanga and Gauteng provinces, South Africa. It is a tributary of the Olifants River.

Course
The Wilge River has its origin about 15 km WNW of Leandra, in the highveld grasslands between this town and Springs, Gauteng. It flows roughly northwards until it is joined by its main tributary, the Bronkhorstspruit, that joins its left bank about 25 km downstream of Bronkhorstspruit town. Then it flows in a northeastern direction until it joins the Olifants about 12 km upstream from the head of the Loskop Dam reservoir.

Other tributaries of the Wilge are the Kendal and the Devon River.

See also 
 List of rivers of South Africa
 List of reservoirs and dams in South Africa

References

External links
The Olifants River Basin, South Africa
Olifants River Catchment
Channel Slopes in the Olifants, Crocodile and Sabie River Catchments

Olifants River (Limpopo)
Rivers of Gauteng
Rivers of Mpumalanga